(Hanja for Hangul:  Gwan dong),  (Simplified Chinese), or  (Japanese Kanto), all literally meaning East of the Pass, may refer to the following:

Manchuria, a region historically called as Guandong in Northeastern China
Kwantung Army (Japanese: 関東軍 Kantōgun), a unit of the Imperial Japanese Army
Kwantung Leased Territory (Japanese: 関東州 Kantōshū), a Japanese possession in Northeastern China until the end of World War II
Kanto, several regions in Japan
Gwandong, a region in both North and South Korea

See also
Guandong (disambiguation)